Stuck is a 2002 Canadian feature-length video drama film written and directed by Lindsay Bourne. It features Amanda Tapping as Liz, JR Bourne as Bernie, Fred Henderson as Gordon, and Courtney Kramer as Cindy.

Synopsis
When four people from very different backgrounds find themselves stuck in an elevator, they find themselves confronting each other and themselves. Will they emerge with their views on the world, others and themselves changed or will the stay stuck in what they believe and in their prejudices?

Cast
 Amanda Tapping as Liz
 JR Bourne as Bernie
 Fred Henderson as Gordon
 Courtney Kramer as Cindy

External links
 

2002 films
2002 drama films
2000s English-language films
Canadian drama films
English-language Canadian films
2000s Canadian films